The fifth season of the television comedy series Mike & Molly began airing on December 8, 2014, in its new Monday at 8:30 pm timeslot and concluded on May 18, 2015, on CBS in the United States. The season is produced by Chuck Lorre Productions and Warner Bros. Television, with series showrunner Al Higgins serving as executive producer along with Chuck Lorre. On March 13, 2014, CBS renewed Mike & Molly for a fifth season. This season also featured its 100th episode. On November 17, 2014, it was announced that the fifth season would premiere on December 8, 2014, replacing cancelled comedy The Millers.

The series focuses on the title characters Mike Biggs (Billy Gardell) and Molly Flynn (Melissa McCarthy), a couple who meet at an Overeaters Anonymous meeting in Chicago, Illinois. After Molly, a primary-school teacher (changing career to author in season 4), invites police officer Mike to give a talk to her class, they begin dating. As of the end of season 2, the two are married. Mike and Molly live in the home of Molly's mother Joyce (Swoosie Kurtz) and sister Victoria (Katy Mixon). Joyce is married to widower Vince Moranto (Louis Mustillo). Mike is regularly kept company by his best friend and partner in the police force, Carl McMillan (Reno Wilson). Other prominent characters in the series include Mike's mother Peggy (Rondi Reed), cafe worker/owner Samuel (Nyambi Nyambi),  and Mike and Molly's friend and co-Overeaters Anonymous member Harry (David Anthony Higgins).

Cast

Main
 Billy Gardell as Mike Biggs (22 episodes)
 Melissa McCarthy as Molly Flynn (22 episodes)
 Reno Wilson as Carl McMillan (22 episodes)
 Katy Mixon as Victoria Flynn (22 episodes)
 Nyambi Nyambi as Samuel / Babatunde (18 episodes)
 Rondi Reed as Peggy Biggs (14 episodes)
 Louis Mustillo as Vince Moranto (22 episodes)
 David Anthony Higgins as Harry (7 episodes)
 Swoosie Kurtz as Joyce Flynn (22 episodes)

Special guest stars
 Margo Martindale as Rosemary Ritter
 Kathy Bates as Kay McKinnon

Recurring and guest appearances
 Cleo King as Rosetta McMillan 'Nana'
 Casey Washington as Officer Ramirez
 Jenny O'Hara as Mikey
 Patricia Belcher as Rose
 Peggy Miley as Joan
 Sarah Baker as Stacey
 Beth Lacke as Karen
 Lauri Johnson as Ann
 Jim Holmes as Dr. Wexler
 Steve Valentine as Xander Van Xander
 Becky O'Donahue as Charisma
 Josh Dean as Father Justin
 Marianne Muellerleile as Connie
 Cheryl Hawker as Lynette
 Joel Murray as Dr. Jeffries
 Eric Allan Kramer as Officer Seely
 Brendan Patrick Connor as George
 Edie McClurg as Paula Martin
 Maile Flanagan as Darlene
 Stefanie Black as Stephanie

Episodes

Ratings

Live and DVR ratings

References

External links
Episode recaps at CBS.com
List of Mike & Molly season 5 episodes at Internet Movie Database

2014 American television seasons
2015 American television seasons
Mike & Molly